The Men's Junior Africa Cup (JAC), formerly known as the Junior Africa Cup of Nations, is a men's international under-21 field hockey tournament organised by the African Hockey Federation. The tournament has been held since 1988 and serves as a qualification tournament for the Men's FIH Hockey Junior World Cup. Competitors must be under the age of 21 as of December 31 in the year before the tournament is held.

Results

Summary

* = host nation

Team appearances

See also
 Men's Hockey Africa Cup of Nations
 Women's Junior Africa Cup
 Men's Hockey Asia Cup
 Men's Junior AHF Cup

References

External links
 Junior Africa Cup

 
Junior
Field hockey
Hockey Junior Africa Cup
Africa Cup